Christian Gödl  (born 17 March 1980) is an Austrian professional darts player who currently plays in World Darts Federation (WDF) events. In the past, he played in Professional Darts Corporation (PDC) tournaments, representing Austria twice on the PDC European Tour.

Career
In 2018, he tried the European Q-School in Hildesheim, but was unable to get a PDC Tour Card. He made his PDC European Tour debut in the 2018 German Darts Grand Prix, but was whitewashed 6–0 by Stephen Bunting. At the beginning of January 2019 he went back to the Q-School in Hildesheim, where he made it to the final on the first day and only there had to admit defeat to Dutchman Niels Zonneveld. He tackled the PDC Challenge Tour in 2019, on which he made it to the quarterfinals twice. Gödl has also qualified for the 2019 Austrian Darts Championship, but he lost again. This time he was defeated by Jeffrey de Zwaan.

In November 2022, he showed up at the PDC East Europe Qualifier for the 2023 PDC World Darts Championship and he lost in the final game against Sebastian Białecki. Two weeks later, he played for the first time in the 2022 Winmau World Masters. He lost in the fifth round to eventual winner Wesley Plaisier. 
On November 12, he won the qualification for the 2023 WDF World Darts Championship.

World Championship results

WDF
 2023:

References

External links

1980 births
Living people
Austrian darts players
21st-century Austrian people